Arthur George Cocksedge (4 September 1892 – 30 September 1973) was a British gymnast who competed in the 1920 Summer Olympics and a member of the 1924 Summer Olympics team, though he did not compete. As a member of the British team in 1920 he finished fifth in the  team, European system competition.

He was a member of the Northampton Polytechnic Institute Gymanist Club and was the Champion of United Kingdom in 1920.

References

1892 births
1973 deaths
British male artistic gymnasts
Gymnasts at the 1920 Summer Olympics
Gymnasts at the 1924 Summer Olympics
Olympic gymnasts of Great Britain